The Minister of State at the Department of Public Expenditure, National Development Plan Delivery and Reform is a junior ministerial post in the Department of Public Expenditure, National Development Plan Delivery and Reform of the Government of Ireland who performs duties and functions delegated by the Minister for Public Expenditure, National Development Plan Delivery and Reform. A Minister of State does not hold cabinet rank.

There are currently two Ministers of State, who were appointed in July 2020:
Patrick O'Donovan, TD – Minister of State with responsibility for the Office of Public Works
Ossian Smyth, TD – Minister of State with responsibility for Public Procurement and eGovernment

List of Ministers of State

References

Public Expenditure and Reform
Department of Public Expenditure, National Development Plan Delivery and Reform